Vocea ta (Romanian for Your Voice) is the debut solo studio album by Romanian singer-songwriter Elena Gheorghe. Released in summer 2006, it is her first studio album since leaving the Latino pop band Mandinga, where she was the lead vocalist until 2005. The album is of pop, Latino-pop and dance music genre, being very similar to her two previous albums with Mandinga.

"Vocea Ta", the lead single of the album, was a smash radio hit in Romania. 
It reached #24 in the list of the most heard songs in 2006 and became later a top-ten hit in the Romanian Top 100. The second and final single from the full-length record was released in January 2007, although it reached only #21 in the Romanian charts, it had much bigger success than her previous hit.
Later it won the award of "Best song of 2007" accorded by the Romanian Music Awards. Gheorghe was named the female of 2006 by the RRA Awards. The album also contains a remix of "Soarele Meu", a previous hit made with Mandinga.

Track listing

Singles

Awards

References

2006 debut albums
Elena Gheorghe albums
Romanian music